The Goa Cricket Association Academy Ground, formerly known as the District Institute of Education and Training Ground, is a cricket ground in Porvorim, Goa, India.  The first recorded match held on the ground came in November 2008 when Goa Under-16s played Kerala Under-16s.  Two first-class matches have been played at the ground, the first of which came in the 2011-11 Ranji Trophy.  The first saw Goa play Jharkhand, while the second saw Tripura as the visitors.  The Goa Cricket Academy is based at the ground.

References

External links
Goa Cricket Association Academy Ground at ESPNcricinfo
Goa Cricket Association Academy Ground at CricketArchive

Cricket grounds in Goa
Buildings and structures in North Goa district
Porvorim
2008 establishments in Goa
Sports venues completed in 2008